Vista Alegre is a town in the southwest side of  Trujillo city, is in Victor Larco Herrera District  in the province of Trujillo, La Libertad Region, Peru.

Population
This seaside town located one kilometer approximately from the sea, is completely urbanized and at year 2011 its estimated population is 10,000 people. In this town is located an office of the RENIEC located at the intersection of Larco avenue and Ayacucho street.

Infrastructure
In the education sector, there are several schools as Víctor Larco and Andrés Avelino Cáceres. In the health sector, this town has the Vista Alegre Hospital inaugurated in July 2011 intended for the attention of the district's population Victor Larco Herrera.  In the sports sector, it is used the Vista Alegre Stadium where develops the league championship soccer Victor Larco. Manuel Seoane Avenue is the main thoroughfare of the town which extends up to Buenos Aires beach.

Main streets
Manuel Seoane avenue, it starts in Huamán avenue and it goes till Pacific Ocean in Buenos Aires beach towards the west of Trujillo city.
Larco Avenue, it passes at north part of Vista Alegre.
Huamán Avenue, it passes at east side of Vista Alegre.
Dos de Mayo Avenue it limits Vista Alegre with Buenos Aires in the west side.

Geography

Main square of Vista Alegre is located at coordinates 79° 02' 53.61" longitude west of Greenwich meridian and 8° 8' 20.26" latitude south. In this central square is located the church of Vista Alegre, "Andrés Avelino Cáceres" school and Hospital Vista Alegre. Due to its proximity to the Pacific Ocean, 1 km from Buenos Aires beach, Vista Alegre has a temperate climate in the day, cold and wet at night without extreme temperatures. In winter, temperatures range between 14°C and 18°C with a humidity between 88% to 94%.

Climate

See also

References

External links

Map of Vista Alegre
"Huaca de la luna and Huaca del sol"
"Huacas del Sol y de la Luna Archaeological Complex", Official Website
Information on El Brujo Archaeological Complex
Chan Chan World Heritage Site, UNESCO
Chan Chan conservation project
Website about Trujillo, Reviews, Events, Business Directory

Multimedia
 
 
 
 Gallery pictures by Panoramio, Includes Geographical information by various authors
Colonial Trujillo photos

Localities of Trujillo, Peru